Quantoxhead may refer to:
East Quantoxhead, Somerset, England
West Quantoxhead, Somerset, England